Kęstutis Dirgėla (born May 9, 1960, Klaipėda) is a Lithuanian engineer and politician.

He was member of the Seimas (Lithuanian parliament) from November 24, 1992 to November 22, 1996.

He was General Director of Lithuanian Railways (2000–2001).

References

Members of the Seimas
Lithuanian engineers
Living people
1960 births
Dirgėla